The George Pólya Award is presented annually by the Mathematical Association of America (MAA) for articles of expository excellence that have been published in The College Mathematics Journal.  The award was established in 1976 and up to two awards of $1,000 each are given in each year. The award is named after Hungarian mathematician George Pólya.

Recipients 
Recipients of the George Pólya Award have included:

See also
 List of mathematics awards

References

Awards of the Mathematical Association of America